Ondřej Smetana (born 4 September 1982) is a Czech football coach and former player who coaches Vysočina Jihlava. Smetana started his football career in his native Ostrava at FC Vítkovice. He eventually appeared in several other Czech 2. Liga clubs before moving to Czech First League's Slovan Liberec. He signed a contract with Belgian side Sint-Truiden for the 2011–12 season.

Playing career
Smetana spent the first nine years of his professional career in various clubs in the first three leagues in the Czech Republic, before moving to Belgium and finally Germany from 2010 via Slovakia. There, he signed a one-year contract with 3. Liga club Hansa Rostock in June 2012, initially on loan from Belgian Sint-Truiden; a purchase option was also agreed. Smetana then played for Hansa Rostock in 25 games in which he scored a total of eight goals. In addition, he was voted the 3. Liga player of the month in September and October 2012 and ultimately took the second place in the 3. Liga player of the year election. After a brief stint in the first division of Cyprus, 3. Liga club SV Elversberg signed him for the second half of the season. This was followed by a season at Fotbal Třinec and in summer 2015 the move to Union Neuhofen / Ybbs in Austria.

Coaching career
Smetana started his coaching career at MFK Vítkovice as a youth coach.

In December 2017 it was confirmed, that Smetana would take charge of FC Odra Petřkovice from 1 January 2018. However, he decided to resign on 10 September 2018. He took charge of the team once again at the beginning of the 2019-20 season. He left the club in January 2020, to take up a head coach role at his former club MFK Vítkovice. However, Smetana wasn't able to save the club from relegation to the Moravian–Silesian Football League and left the club by the end of the season.

On 18 August 2020, Smetana was appointed as the head coach of FC Baník Ostrava's B-team playing in the Moravian–Silesian Football League. In February 2021 he was appointed as the head coach of Baník's A-team following the sacking of Luboš Kozel. In October 2022 Smetana was appointed as the head coach of FC Vysočina Jihlava playing in the Czech National Football League.

References

External links
 Profile at iDNES.cz
 Ondřej Smetana at ÖFB

1982 births
Living people
Sportspeople from Ostrava
Association football forwards
Czech footballers
Slovak Super Liga players
Czech First League players
Czech National Football League players
Belgian Pro League players
3. Liga players
Cypriot First Division players
FC Slovan Liberec players
1. FC Slovácko players
MFK Vítkovice players
Baník Ratíškovice players
Fotbal Fulnek players
FK Senica players
Sint-Truidense V.V. players
ŠK Slovan Bratislava players
FC Hansa Rostock players
Enosis Neon Paralimni FC players
SV Elversberg players
FK Fotbal Třinec players
Czech football managers
Czech National Football League managers
Moravian-Silesian Football League managers
FC Odra Petřkovice managers
MFK Vítkovice managers
FC Baník Ostrava managers
FC Vysočina Jihlava managers
Czech expatriate footballers
Czech expatriate sportspeople in Slovakia
Expatriate footballers in Slovakia
Czech expatriate sportspeople in Belgium
Expatriate footballers in Belgium
Czech expatriate sportspeople in Germany
Expatriate footballers in Germany
Czech expatriate sportspeople in Cyprus
Expatriate footballers in Cyprus
Czech expatriate sportspeople in Austria
Expatriate footballers in Austria